This article displays the qualifying draw for women's singles at the 1977 Australian Open (December).

Seeds

Qualifiers

Lucky losers

Qualifying draw

First qualifier

Second qualifier

Third qualifier

Fourth qualifier

External links
 1977 Australian Open (December) – Women's draws and results at the International Tennis Federation

Women's Singles Qualifying
Australian Open (tennis) by year – Qualifying